KQED-FM (88.5 MHz) is a NPR-member radio station in San Francisco, California. Its parent organization is KQED Inc., which also owns its television partners, both of which are PBS member outlets: KQED (channel 9) and KQEH (channel 54). Studio operations for all three are located on Mariposa Street in the Mission District of San Francisco, while its transmitter is located atop San Bruno Mountain.

History

KXKX
The San Francisco Theological Seminary, a Presbyterian group, began broadcasting with station KXKX in April 1963. The new 110,000-watt station signed on two years after the seminary received a construction permit in August 1961. In addition to Christian programming, the station's subcarrier broadcast theology courses to receivers at 44 Bay Area churches.

When agencies of the Presbyterian Church (USA) could no longer support the station, KXKX signed off at midnight on the evening of June 29, 1967.

KQED-FM
In July 1968, the San Francisco Theological Seminary filed to sell KXKX to the Bay Area Educational Television Association, owner of KQED (channel 9). The station returned to the air as KQED-FM in mid-1969, originally using the studios at 286 Divisadero Street inherited from the seminary. The founding manager was Bernard Mayes, who later went on to be executive vice president of KQED television and also co-founder and chairman of NPR. The first programming of KQED-FM included news, 'street radio' broadcast live from local street corners, drama and music. In its third year on the air, KQED-FM became one of the first 80 NPR affiliates—five of which were in California—to air the first edition of All Things Considered. Later, due to reduced funding, Mayes opened the air to 'Tribal Radio' - productions by local non-profit groups, some in their own languages.

Current programming
Today, KQED-FM is one of the most-listened to public radio stations in the United States, and ranks first in the San Francisco market as of July 2018. In addition to local programming, KQED-FM carries content from major public radio distributors such as National Public Radio, Public Radio Exchange, BBC World Service, and American Public Media. Among the locally produced shows are Forum with Mina Kim and Alexis Madrigal, The California Report, and Perspectives. Tech Nation is produced at KQED studios.

In addition to over-the-air broadcasts, KQED-FM audio is carried on Comcast digital cable channel 960 and is webcast with live streaming audio around the clock. The station's live stream is also available through its mobile app. Forum is carried live, nationwide, on Sirius Satellite Radio. KQED also offers an extensive audio archive and podcasts of previous shows for download.

One of the most famous programs to have been broadcast on KQED was An Hour with Pink Floyd, a 60-minute performance by Pink Floyd recorded in 1970 without an audience at the station's studio. The program was broadcast only twice—once in 1970, and once again in 1981. The setlist included "Atom Heart Mother", "Cymbaline", "Grantchester Meadows", "Green Is the Colour", "Careful with That Axe, Eugene", and "Set the Controls for the Heart of the Sun".

Expansion into Sacramento
In 2003, KQED Radio expanded to the Sacramento area by purchasing KEBR-FM at 89.3 in North Highlands from Family Radio, a religious broadcaster based in Oakland.  The call letters were changed to KQEI, and it became a full-time satellite of KQED Radio.

Ransomware attack
In July 2017, The San Francisco Chronicle reported that the radio station was the victim of a massive ransomware attack which began on June 15, 2017. More than a month later, many critical systems were still offline and during the attack email was down, hard drives were locked, and prerecorded programs were lost.

Additional frequencies
In addition to the main station, KQED-FM is relayed by these stations and translators to widen its broadcast area.

KQED and KQEI also broadcast HD Radio.

References

External links
KQED Car Donation Program kqed.careasy.org
 
 
 FCC history cards for KQED-FM
 

NPR member stations
QED-FM
Radio stations established in 1963
KQED Inc.
1963 establishments in California